Mahant Rituparna Kishore Das (born 3 July 1922) was an Indian politician from the state of the Madhya Pradesh. He represented Khairagarh Vidhan Sabha constituency of undivided Madhya Pradesh Legislative Assembly after winning at the 1952 and 1957 general election. He was also the last ruler of Chhuikhadan State.

References 

1922 births
Possibly living people
Madhya Pradesh MLAs 1957–1962
People from Madhya Pradesh
People from Rajnandgaon
Indian National Congress politicians from Madhya Pradesh